Kokouvi Pius Agbetomey (born July 11, 1956) is a Togolese Juge. He is Togo’s Minister of Justice and Relations with the Republic’s Institutions since June 28, 2015.

References 

Togolese Christians
Law of Togo